Juan Pedro Jiménez Melero (born 31 March 1996), commonly known as Juanpe, is a Spanish footballer who plays for CD Lugo as a central midfielder.

Club career

Cádiz
Born in Jerez de la Frontera, Andalusia, Juanpe was a Cádiz CF youth graduate. On 2 December 2014, he renewed his contract for five seasons, and made his senior debut for the reserves late in the month by coming on as a late substitute in a 2–0 Tercera División home win against CD Mairena.

On 13 January 2016, Juanpe was an unused substitute in a 0–2 Copa del Rey away loss against Celta de Vigo. On 19 August he made his professional debut, replacing Abel Gómez in a 1–1 away draw against UD Almería.

On 1 January 2017, Juanpe was loaned to Segunda División B side Atlético Mancha Real, until June.

Sevilla
In August 2018, Juanpe joined Sevilla FC; initially assigned to the C-team in the fourth tier, he was promoted to the reserves in September. On 5 November 2018, he renewed his contract until 2020, being a regular starter afterwards.

On 11 October 2019, Juanpe further extended his contract with Sevilla until 2021.

Lugo
On 12 August 2020, free agent Juanpe signed a three-year contract with CD Lugo in the second division. He scored his first professional goal on 29 October, netting a last-minute equalizer in a 1–1 draw at CD Tenerife.

References

External links

Juanpe profile at Cadistas1910 

1996 births
Living people
Footballers from Jerez de la Frontera
Spanish footballers
Association football midfielders
Segunda División players
Segunda División B players
Tercera División players
Cádiz CF B players
Cádiz CF players
Sevilla FC C players
Sevilla Atlético players
CD Lugo players